Staromunasipovo (İśke Monasip) is a rural locality (a village) in Staromunasipovsky Selsoviet, Burzyansky District, Bashkortostan, Russia. The population was 635 as of 2010. There are 12 streets.

Geography 
Staromunasipovo is located 25 km northeast of Starosubkhangulovo (the district's administrative centre) by road. Novomunasipovo is the nearest rural locality.

References 

Rural localities in Burzyansky District